Renard is a motorcycle brand manufactured in Estonia. The brand was founded in 1938 by J. Lään and was based in Tallinn.

Early production
Renard produced lightweight motorcycles from 1938. "Renard" is French for fox, and a fox's head was used as the brand's logo. The first models had a 98cc Sachs two-stroke engine, and had an appearance similar to a Wanderer motorcycle. They were finished in black with gold coach-lines. In March 1944, when the country was occupied by Nazi Germany, during a bombing raid by the Soviets, the factory suffered a direct hit and was destroyed. Production never started again. No examples of the machines exist, but frame no. 2 from 1938 frame survives.

2008 revival
In 2008, a number of Estonian engineers and business people, led by Andres Uibomäe, decided to revive the brand. In April 2010, a prototype of a new motorcycle was presented at the Hanover Technology Fair: the Renard Grand Tourer. This has a 125hp longitudinal eight-valve Moto Guzzi V-twin as power source. The machine had a very modern design, with a carbon fiber/Kevlar monocoque frame and a trailed swing front fork with a single, central coil spring. The first production bike was delivered in September 2015. Production is around 100 units a year.

References

External links
 

Motorcycle manufacturers of Estonia
Companies based in Tallinn
Estonian brands